Bukov Vrh nad Visokim is a settlement above Visoko pri Poljanah in the Municipality of Škofja Loka in the Upper Carniola region of Slovenia.

Geography
Bukov Vrh nad Visokim is a dispersed settlement in the northwestern part of the Polhov Gradec Hills. It consists of the isolated Dolinec, Golar, Kuzovec, Skobelj, and Švint farms, as well as the hamlet of Podskalar (with the Boštar, Brnovi, and Šuštar farms). The highest elevation in the settlement is Pasja ravan (literally, 'dog plateau', elevation ). Sovpat Creek, a tributary of the Poljane Sora River, borders the settlement to the northeast and is fed by several small creeks in the settlement. The name Sovpat is the Poljane dialect form of the word sopot 'stream with waterfalls'.

Name
The name Bukov Vrh nad Visokim literally means 'beech peak above Visoko'. Like similar names (e.g., Bukovo, Bukovica, Bukovec, etc.), it is derived from the Slovene adjective bukov, from the common noun bukev 'beech', referring to the local vegetation.

History
The area was settled between the 12th and early 14th centuries by ethnic Slovenians from Carinthia. During the Second World War there was an engagement between German forces and members of the Partisans' Cankar Brigade at the Skobelj farm, where there is a small memorial.

References

External links 

Bukov Vrh nad Visokim at Geopedia

Populated places in the Municipality of Škofja Loka